Mount Andromache is a  mountain summit located in the Bow River valley of Banff National Park, in the Canadian Rockies of Alberta, Canada. The nearest higher neighbor is Mount Hector,  to the south. Mount Andromache can be seen from the Icefields Parkway as the road traverses the western base of the peak. The Molar Glacier is situated on the northeast aspect of the mountain. Precipitation runoff from Mount Andromache drains into tributaries of the Bow River.

History

The first ascent of the mountain was made in 1887 by James J. McArthur and Tom Riley of the Dominion Land Survey. Mount Andromache was named in 1948 by the Alpine Club of Canada for Andromache, who in Greek mythology was the wife of Hector.

Climate

Based on the Köppen climate classification, Mount Andromache is located in a subarctic climate with cold, snowy winters, and mild summers. Winter temperatures can drop below −20 °C with wind chill factors below −30 °C. The months July through September offer the most favorable weather for viewing and climbing this mountain.

Geology

Like other mountains in Banff Park, Mount Andromache is composed of sedimentary rock laid down during the Precambrian to Jurassic periods. Formed in shallow seas, this sedimentary rock was pushed east and over the top of younger rock during the Laramide orogeny.

See also

Geology of Alberta
Geography of Alberta

Gallery

References

External links
 Parks Canada web site: Banff National Park
 Climbing Mt. Andromache: Bob Spirko
 Mt. Andromache: Flickr photo

Three-thousanders of Alberta
Mountains of Banff National Park
Alberta's Rockies
Canadian Rockies